Erikli (literally "with plums") is a Turkic place name that may refer to:

 Ərikli, a village in the Lachin Rayon, Azerbaijan
 Erikli, Bandırma, a village
 Erikli, Bozüyük, a village in the district of Bozüyük, Bilecik Province
 Erikli, Burdur
 Erikli, Kahta, a village in the district of Kahta, Adıyaman Province
 Erikli, Keşan
 Erikli, Sason, a village in the district of Sason, Batman Province
 Erikli, Şavşat, a village in the district of Şavşat, Artvin Province
 Erikli Raid, a raid made by Turkish forces on the Greeks during the Greco-Turkish War